The Chandigarh–Firozpur Cantonment Express is an Express train belonging to Northern Railway zone that runs between  and  in India. It is currently being operated with 14613/14614 train numbers on a daily basis.

Service

The 14613/Chandigarh–Firozpur Express has an average speed of 47 km/hr and covers 236 km in 5h. The 14614/Firozpur–Chandigarh Express has an average speed of 50 km/hr and covers 236 km in 4h 45m.

Route and halts 

The important halts of the train are:

Coach composition

The train has standard ICF rakes with max speed of 110 km/h. The train consists of 16 coaches:

 14 General Unreserved
 2 Seating cum Luggage Rake

Traction

Both trains are hauled by a Ludhiana Loco Shed based WDM-3A diesel locomotive from Firozpur to Chandigarh and vice versa.

Direction reversal

The train reverses its direction 1 times:

See also 

 Firozpur Cantonment railway station
 Chandigarh Junction railway station
 Sutlej Express
 Delhi–Firozpur Passenger

Notes

References

External links 

 14613/Chandigarh - Firozpur Express
 14614/Firozpur - Chandigarh Express

Transport in Firozpur
Express trains in India
Rail transport in Punjab, India
Rail transport in Chandigarh
Railway services introduced in 2015